Greendell may refer to:

 Greendell station (Delaware, Lackawanna and Western Railroad),  Green Township, New Jersey, USA
 Greendell, New Jersey, an unincorporated community in Green Township, Sussex County; in USA.
 Greendell Elementary School, Palo Alto, California, USA; part of the Palo Alto Unified School District

See also
 Greendale (disambiguation)
 Greenvale (disambiguation)
 Green Valley (disambiguation)